The 2012 Swedish Open was a tennis tournament played on outdoor clay courts as part of the ATP World Tour 250 Series of the 2012 ATP World Tour and as part of the International Series on the 2012 WTA Tour. It took place in Båstad, Sweden, from 7 July until 15 July 2012 for the Men's tournament and from July 14 through July 22, 2012 for the Women's tournament.  It was also known as the 2012 SkiStar Swedish Open for the Men's and the 2012 Sony Swedish Open for the Women's for sponsorship reasons. It was the 65th edition for the men's and the 4th edition for the women's. David Ferrer and Polona Hercog won the singles titles.

ATP singles main draw entrants

Seeds

 1 Seedings are based on the rankings of June 25, 2012

Other entrants
The following players received wildcards into the singles main draw:
  Christian Lindell
  Michael Ryderstedt
  Tommy Robredo

The following players received entry from the qualifying draw:
  Thiago Alves
  Alessandro Giannessi
  Evgeny Korolev
  Ivo Minář

Withdrawals
  Tomáš Berdych (knee injury)
  Gaël Monfils (knee injury)

ATP doubles main draw entrants

Seeds

 Rankings are as of June 25, 2012

Other entrants
The following pairs received wildcards into the doubles main draw:
  Filip Bergevi /  Fred Simonsson
  Patrik Rosenholm /  Michael Ryderstedt
The following pair received entry as alternates:
  Roberto Bautista-Agut /  Jürgen Zopp

WTA singles main draw entrants

Seeds

 1 Rankings are as of July 9, 2012

Other entrants
The following players received wildcards into the singles main draw:
  Rebecca Peterson 
  Laura Robson 
  Sandra Roma

The following players received entry from the qualifying draw:
  Annika Beck
  Lourdes Domínguez Lino 
  Mariana Duque Mariño
  Carina Witthöft

The following players received entry as Lucky Loser:
  Jill Craybas

Withdrawals
  Sara Errani (shoulder injury)
  Kaia Kanepi (heels)

WTA doubles main draw entrants

Seeds

1 Rankings are as of July 9, 2012

Other entrants
The following pairs received wildcards into the doubles main draw:
  Beatrice Cedermark /  Rebecca Peterson
  Hilda Melander /  Sandra Roma

Retirements
  Lourdes Domínguez Lino (thigh muscle strain)
  Julia Görges (foot injury)
  Olga Govortsova (viral illness)

Finals

Men's singles

 David Ferrer defeated  Nicolás Almagro, 6–2, 6–2

Women's singles

 Polona Hercog defeated  Mathilde Johansson, 0–6, 6–4, 7–5

Men's doubles

 Robert Lindstedt /  Horia Tecău defeated  Alexander Peya /  Bruno Soares 6–3, 7–6(7–5)

Women's doubles

 Catalina Castaño /  Mariana Duque Mariño defeated  Eva Hrdinová /  Mervana Jugić-Salkić, 4–6, 7–5, [10–5]

References

External links
 Official website